Suzy Nakamura (born December 2, 1968) is an American actress and improv comedian. She is known for her many guest appearances on sitcoms such as According to Jim, Half and Half, 8 Simple Rules, Curb Your Enthusiasm and How I Met Your Mother and her recurring role in the early seasons of the drama The West Wing as assistant to the Sam Seaborn character, as well as Dr. Miura in the ABC sitcom Modern Family. She had leading roles in the television shows Dr. Ken and Avenue 5.

Early life 
Nakamura was born and raised in Chicago, Illinois, to parents of Japanese descent. Her father was an English teacher for the Chicago Public Schools. Her parents died within a year of each other when she was in her twenties. She has one older brother. Nakamura attended Lane Technical College Prep High School. After graduation, she joined the Asian-American theatre company, MinaSama-No. 

Nakamura studied theater at Columbia College Chicago from 1987 to 1989.  She would attend every other semester as she had to finance her education herself. In 1991, Nakamura was the first Asian American woman to join The Second City improvisational comedy troupe. She remained a part of the troupe for five years.

Nakamura worked at Crate & Barrel prior to working as an actor.

Career 
Nakamura has acted in various films, television shows, commercials, web-series, and stage plays throughout her career, in addition to performing improv comedy.

She cofounded The Second City Detroit in 1993.

Nakamura got her first film role as a troubled teen in Rea Tajiri's Chicago-based film, Strawberry Fields (1997). It was an official selection at the 54th Venice International Film Festival.

On May 7, 2015, ABC picked up Ken Jeong's Dr. Ken starring Jeong as a fictional version of himself and Nakamura as his wife for its 2015-16 Fall Season. Jeong had previously gotten Nakamura a role in Judd Apatow's Funny People, but the scene was ultimately cut.

She was an honoree at the East West Players' 52nd Visionary Award in 2018.

In August 2018, it was announced that Nakamura had joined HBO's television comedy Avenue 5 as Iris Kimura, the assistant to Josh Gad's billionaire character, Herman Judd. The series premiered on January 19, 2020.

She had a recurring role as investigative reporter Irene Abe on FX's crime drama television series Snowfall.

Personal life
Nakamura was married to Harry Hannigan. They separated in 2018 and have since divorced.

Filmography

Film

Television

Video games

Theatre
 An Infinite Ache
 The Showatorium
 Coptors
 Shogun's Heroes
 Coed Prison Sluts - The Musical
 The Armando Diaz Experience
 The Deconstruction Derby
 The Zodiac Thrillers
 The Dickie Bell Twist Dance Party
 Pen to Paper
 The Second City Alumni Jam
 The Powerhouse Variety Show
 The Redwood Curtain
 Power to the People Mover
 National Touring Company (The Second City - Chicago)
 POTUS: Or, Behind Every Great Dumbass Are Seven Women Trying to Keep Him Alive (Shubert Theatre - Broadway) as Jean

References

External links

American actresses of Japanese descent
Actresses from Chicago
Living people
American film actresses
American television actresses
20th-century American actresses
21st-century American actresses
1968 births